Tréméreuc is a commune in the Côtes-d'Armor department of Brittany in northwestern France.

Population

Inhabitants of Tréméreuc are called tréméreucois in French.

See also
 Communes of the Côtes-d'Armor department

References

External links

 Official website 

Communes of Côtes-d'Armor